Mehrabadu (also Romanized as Mehrābādū; also known as Mehrābād) is a village in Sofla Rural District, Zavareh District, Ardestan County, Isfahan Province, Iran. At the 2006 census, its population was 73, in 26 families.

References 

Populated places in Ardestan County